The Lumières Award for Best Cinematography — Prix CST is an award presented annually by the Académie des Lumières since 2008.

Winners and nominees
Winners are listed first with a blue background, followed by the other nominees.

2000s

2010s

See also
César Award for Best Cinematography

External links 
 Lumières Award for Best Cinematography at AlloCiné

Best Cinematography
Awards for best cinematography